Kelly Markus (born 7 February 1993) is a Dutch road and track racing cyclist, who most recently rode for UCI Women's Continental Team .

She won the bronze medal as a junior in the points race on the track at the 2011 European Track Championships. Markus competed at the UCI Road World Championships in the 2012 women's team time trial and the 2011 Junior women's road race. Together with Amy Pieters, she won the Dutch Madison national title in 2014.

Her older brother Barry Markus is also a professional cyclist. The siblings are not related to cyclist Riejanne Markus.

Major results

Track

2011
 2nd Madison, National Track Championships (with Amy Pieters)
2012
 National Track Championships
2nd Scratch
3rd Madison (with Amy Pieters)
2013
 National Track Championships
1st  Madison (with Amy Pieters)
3rd Omnium
 International Belgian Open
2nd Scratch
3rd Points race
 2nd Points race, Ballerup Points Event
2014
 National Track Championships
1st  Madison (with Amy Pieters)
3rd Derny
3rd Scratch
2015
 National Track Championships
2nd Madison (with Amy Pieters)
3rd Omnium
3rd Scratch
2016
 National Track Championships
2nd Madison (with Winanda Spoor)
2nd Omnium

Road

2011
 9th Road race, UCI Junior Road World Championships
2015
 3rd Omloop van de IJsseldelta
 8th Road race, UEC European Under-23 Road Championships
 8th Parel van de Veluwe
 10th Grand Prix de Dottignies
 10th Trofee Maarten Wynants
2018
 6th GP Sofie Goos

See also
2011 Skil Koga season
2012 Team Skil-Argos season
2013 Team Argos-Shimano season

References

External links

1993 births
Living people
Dutch female cyclists
Cyclists from Amsterdam
UCI Road World Championships cyclists for the Netherlands
Dutch track cyclists
21st-century Dutch women